Akademia Nauk ( - Academy of Sciences) is a volcano located in the southern part of Kamchatka Peninsula, Russia next to the stratovolcano of Karymsky. The volcano is filled with a few calderas, and the most notable one is known as Karymsky Lake (named after Karyms).

The volcano is named after the Росси́йская Акаде́мия Нау́к, the Russian (Soviet) Academy of Sciences. It last erupted on the 2nd and 3rd of January in 1996.

See also

List of volcanoes in Russia

References

Active volcanoes
Volcanoes of the Kamchatka Peninsula
Mountains of the Kamchatka Peninsula
Calderas of Russia
Pleistocene volcanoes
Holocene Asia
VEI-7 volcanoes